Péter Székely (1955–2003) was a Hungarian chess Grandmaster.

In the 2003 Capablanca Memorial tournament he drew all 13 of his games, the shortest in 8 moves and the longest in 13 for a total of 130 moves played.

References

External links

1955 births
2003 deaths
Chess grandmasters
Hungarian chess players
20th-century chess players